Lamira is an unincorporated community in Belmont County, in the U.S. state of Ohio.

History
Lamira was originally called Lewis' Mills, and under the latter name had its start in the mid-19th century when Jacob and Ira Lewis built a mill there. A post office called Lamira was established in 1850, and remained in operation until 1967.

Notable people
 Earl R. Lewis, member of the U.S. House of Representatives from Ohio's 18th district
 Susanna M. Salter, born in Lamira, first woman elected to be a mayor in the United States in Argonia, Kansas

References

Unincorporated communities in Belmont County, Ohio
1850 establishments in Ohio
Populated places established in 1850
Unincorporated communities in Ohio